Eric Alfred Haggis (29 April 1915 – 6 March 1964) was an Australian rules footballer who played with North Melbourne in the Victorian Football League (VFL).

Notes

External links 

1915 births
1964 deaths
Australian rules footballers from Victoria (Australia)
North Melbourne Football Club players